Hubertus von Pilgrim (born August 24, 1931, in Berlin) is a German artist who lives and works in Pullach near Munich as a sculptor, printmaker, and medallist. He has work in the collections of the Brooklyn Museum and Art Institute of Chicago. He was Vice-Chancellor of the Pour le Mérite from 2009 to 2013.

Life
He studied art history, literature, and philosophy at the University of Heidelberg from 1951 to 1954 while simultaneously being taught sculpture by Erich Heckel. From 1954 to 1960 he studied sculpture under Bernhard Heiliger at the Hochschule der Künste in Berlin. He also studied copperplate printing with Stanley William Hayter in Paris.

He taught at Hochschule für Bildende Künste Braunschweig from 1963 to 1977, then from 1977 he was a professor at the Academy of Fine Arts, Munich until 1995.

Notable works

 Sculptures for the former Dachau concentration camp, including markers for the route of the death march and relief sculptures for Helmut Striffler's chapel  
 A head of Konrad Adenauer, outside Palais Schaumburg, Bonn, which according to Sergiusz Michalski draws on Mexican statuary influenced by Toltec monuments while adding a more expressionistic quality

Awards and honours 
 1995: Pour le Mérite
 1997: Order of Merit of the Federal Republic of Germany
 2005: Bavarian Order of Merit
 2008: Johann Veit Döll medal

References

Bibliography
 Hubertus von Pilgrim, Hubertus von Pilgrim: Ausstellung, Pfalzgalerie Kaiserslautern, April 1977

External links

 Darmstädter Sezession
 German Who's Who

1931 births
Artists from Berlin
Living people
Heidelberg University alumni
Academic staff of the Academy of Fine Arts, Munich
Knights Commander of the Order of Merit of the Federal Republic of Germany
Recipients of the Pour le Mérite (civil class)